Jag är inte rädd för mörkret (Swedish for I Am Not Afraid of the Dark) is the tenth studio album by Swedish alternative rock band Kent. It was released on 25 April 2012 by Sonet Records (Universal Music) and it was the band's debut release with the label since their departure from Sony Music in June 2011. The album was preceded by the lead single "999" on 28 March 2012. Jag är inte rädd för mörkret received positive reviews from Swedish music critics. It debuted at number one in Norway and Sweden, at number two in Denmark and at number five in Finland.

Commercial performance 
Jag är inte rädd för mörkret debuted at number one in Sweden, becoming Kent's ninth consecutive number-one album. In Denmark, the album debuted at number two with first-week sales of 1444 copies. It is their highest-charting album there since Du & jag döden, which debuted at number two in 2005. The album debuted at number five in Finland, becoming the band's lowest-charting album since Hagnesta Hill, which peaked at number six in 2000. In Norway, Jag är inte rädd för mörkret debuted at number one, becoming Kent's first number-one album there since 2005's Du & jag döden.

Track listing

Credits and personnel
Recording
Recorded at Studios la Fabrique, Saint-Rémy-de-Provence, France, and at Park Studio, Älvsjö, Stockholm, Sweden
Mixed at Park Studio, and at Dreamhill, Ekerö, Stockholm, Sweden
Mastered at Marcussen Mastering, Los Angeles, California, United States

Personnel
Joakim Berg – lyrics, music
Kent – music, producer, recording
Martin Sköld – music
Stefan Boman – producer, recording, mixing
Damien Arlot – recording assistant
Thomas Lefebvre – recording assistant
Martin Brengesjö – instrument technician
Niklas Flyckt – mixing
Anders Pantzer – mixing assistant
Stephen Marcussen – mastering
Petra Marklund – backing vocals

Charts and certifications

Charts

Certifications

References 

2012 albums
Kent (band) albums
Swedish-language albums
Pop rock albums by Swedish artists